The 1995 Air Force Falcons football team represented the United States Air Force Academy in the 1995 NCAA Division I-A football season. The team was led by 12th-year head coach Fisher DeBerry and played its home games in Falcon Stadium. It finished the regular season with an 8–4 record overall and a 6–2 record in the Western Athletic Conference, making the team conference co-champions. The team was selected to play in the Copper Bowl, which it lost 41–55 to Texas Tech.

Schedule

Personnel

References

Air Force
Air Force Falcons football seasons
Western Athletic Conference football champion seasons
Air Force Falcons football